The Honda CT110 is a small dual-sport motorcycle made by Honda in Japan since 1980 and is sold in various parts of the world. The bike has sold well worldwide.

The CT110 replaced the CT90, which was essentially the same machine but with a smaller displacement engine.

Design

The base CT110  four-stroke air-cooled single-cylinder engine which is nearly horizontal in the step-through tube/stamping frame. It has a semi-automatic four-speed transmission and a centrifugal clutch. That coupled with a 2:1 ratio gear reduction box known as the dual range sub-transmission, which switched into operation using a small lever under the transmission case, allowed the bike to climb steep slopes.

North America

In the US the CT110 came with factory street legal lighting and mirrors, a large luggage rack, center stand, and an auxiliary gas can.  The 1980 model of CT110 lacked the dual range sub-transmission, but that returned in following years. The motorcycle was imported from 1980 to 1986.

Australia and New Zealand

The CT110 is still in production and sold in other countries around the world. In Australia and New Zealand it is known as a "Postie Bike" due to its use by Australia Post and New Zealand Post as a delivery bike, without the dual range sub-transmission. A slightly modified version, the CT110 AG, is sold for agricultural use. 

After almost 30 years of only being available via second-hand sale from Australia Post in bulk lots, Honda began selling the road-registerable model to the domestic market in July 2009. 

Apart from the Australian market, large numbers of CT110 and CT90 models were also brought to Tanzania in east Africa, where many are still in use today. Among the original users was Danish aid organisation Danida. During the late 1970s and 1980s they were the standard issue motorcycle for volunteers.

See also 
Honda CT series bikes: Trail Cub / Hunter Cub

References 

 1981 Honda CT110 Hunter Cub infobox specifications from these pages on 2008-03-01:
 http://www.honda.co.jp/news/1981/2811001.html
 https://web.archive.org/web/20101223220624/http://www.geocities.co.jp/MotorCity-Circuit/7509/sub9-6.htm
 https://web.archive.org/web/20080301101122/http://www.super-cub.com/history.html

CT110
Motor scooters
Motorcycles introduced in 1980
Postal system of Australia
Postal system of New Zealand